Laughing at the Pieces is the 1986 debut album by Doctor and the Medics. It reached #55 in Canada.

U.K. Track listing

( Issued as: MIRG1010 - IRS Records Ltd. (1986) & MIRGP1010 ( Picture Disc.) - IRS Records Ltd. ( 1986)

Side One
"No-one Loves You When You've Got No Shoes" – 3:37
"Kettle on a Long Chain"  – 3:00
"Come On Call Me" – 2:35
"Watermelon Runaway"  – 2:29
"Fried Egg Bad Monday" – 4:09
"Burn" - 3:29 (extra track on picture disc edition)

All songs written by The Doctor/Ritchie/McGuire/Searle/West

Side Two
"Spirit in the Sky" * – 3:35
"Lucky Lord Jim" – 2:47
"Moon Song" – 4:42
"Barbara Can't Dance"  – 2:37
"Smallness of the Mustard Pot" – 4:07

All songs written by The Doctor/Ritchie/McGuire/Searle/West, except * written by Norman Greenbaum

U.S.Track listing

( Issued as: I.R.S.5797 - (1986) I.R.S.Records Inc. )

Side One
"Spirit In The Sky" - 3:35
"Lucky Lord Jim" - 2:47
"Nobody Loves You When You've Got No Shoes" - 3:37
"Moon Song" - 4:42
"Watermelon Runaway" - 2:29

Side Two
"Burn" - 3:29
"Kettle On A Long Chain" - 3:00
"Miracle Of The Age" - 3:53
"Come On Call Me" - 2:35
"Smallness of the Mustard Pot" - 4:07

All songs credited to The Doctor-Ritchie-McGuire-Searle-West , except "Spirit In The Sky" by Norman Greenbaum.

Singles

This album spawned two singles , with supporting music videos.

"Spirit In The Sky"

 7" U.K. Single: "Spirit In The Sky" / "Laughing At The Pieces ( Studio Version )" - IRM113  / IRS Records Ltd.
( A Side: written by Norman Greenbaum , B Side: written by Doctor-McGuire-Searle-Ritchie-West )

12" U.K. Single:"Spirit In The Sky" - IRMT113 / IRS Records Ltd. ( Issued in Poster Sleeve )
A "Spirit In The Sky" * - 3:29
A "Laughing At The Pieces ( Studio Version )" - 3:20
B "Love Piece And Bananas ( Live )" - 3:54
B "Happy But Twisted ( Live )" - 2:03
B "Fried Egg , Bad Monday ( Live )" - 4:03
B "Good Golly Miss Molly ( Live )" ** - 4:56

( All songs written by Doctor-McGuire-Searle-Ritchie-West , except , * by Norman Greenbaum & ** by Blackwell / Marascalco )

"Burn"

7" U.K. Single: "Burn" / "Captain Frazer" - IRM119 / IRS Records Ltd. ( U.S. single replaces "Captain Frazer" with "Barbara Can't Dance" )
( Both songs credited to Doctor-McGuire-Searle-Ritchie-West )

12" U.K. Single:"Burn" - IRMT119 / IRS Records ltd.
A "Burn"
A "Captain Frazer"
B "Love Peace And Bananas ( Studio Version )"
B "Paranoid ( Live )" *

( All songs credited to Doctor-McGuire-Searle-Ritchie-West , except * by W.Ward , T.Butler , J.Osborne & F.Iommi )

Personnel
Doctor and the Medics
 The Doctor (Clive Jackson) - lead vocals
 Steve McGuire - guitar
 Richard Searle - bass guitar
 Steve "Vom" Ritchie - drums
 Wendi and Colette Anadin - backing vocals

References

External links
Doctor and the Medics official website
"Laughing at the Pieces" at Discogs

1986 debut albums
Doctor and the Medics albums
Albums produced by Craig Leon
I.R.S. Records albums
Illegal Records albums